A car-spotting game is one that is played during a car ride, especially a road trip, where occupants of a vehicle compete to be the first to spot a car of a certain description. Many variations exist around the world. The first to call a particular target either scores points which are tracked over the course of the journey, or they earn the right to lightly punch an opponent.

Punch buggy

Punch buggy (also called slug bug) is a car-spotting game where players seek Volkswagen Beetles, calling "Punch buggy!" when they do so, in reference to the Beetle's nickname, the Bug.

Padiddle

Padiddle, alternatively spelled pediddle or perdiddle, is a night driving game where players look for vehicles with a single burnt-out headlight or brake light, the word padiddle being a slang term for such a vehicle. The term Popeye is also used, due to it looking like one eye is out or squinting.

Play

The objective is to be the first to spot a qualifying vehicle. The spotter must say "padiddle" to earn one point for a single headlight sighting, and "little dip" to earn 3 points for a single tail light sighting. Players lose 5 points for errant callouts (e.g. motorcycles or two working lights). In some groups, the spotter must simultaneously hit the ceiling of the car or hit the window glass, and in others, punch or kiss another passenger. The person with the highest score at the end of the trip is the winner. In another version, the first person to get to 3 "padiddles" is the winner and gets to make a wish. 

In some variants the last member of the car to punch the ceiling loses one article of clothing. Following this style of play, the winner is the last person wearing clothes in the car. This is sometimes played in teams where every member of the losing team must remove an article of clothing.

Other calls for padiddle include:
 Padunkle a car with only one taillight
 Cyclops a semi-truck with only one headlight.
 Wee woo an ambulance without its lights on.
 Party lights Police car with lights on.
 Padoodle Car with both lights off.

Qualifying vehicles must be visible through the windshield of the vehicle; "padiddles" seen through a side or rear-view mirror only count for half a point. A motorcycle misidentified as a padiddle is a foul that awards the offender's partner a double hit or kiss. Players can not use their own vehicle as a point.

Fog lights do not count as a padiddle even if used as primary lights. There is no such thing as a double padiddle.

Yellow car

A version of the game in Europe involves spotting yellow cars, and it appears in the British radio sitcom Cabin Pressure under the name "yellow car", with no scoring.

In the United States, this game is known as "banana", and in Australia it is called Spotto.

Other targets
One author suggests similar games with station wagons, convertibles, trucks and buses.

Other goals and calls include:

A generic name for the game is car tag.

See also

References

American cultural conventions
Car games
Children's games
Volkswagen Beetle